Lyamino is the name of several inhabited localities in Russia.

Urban localities
Lyamino, Perm Krai, a work settlement under the administrative jurisdiction of the town of krai significance of Chusovoy in Perm Krai

Rural localities
Lyamino, Kostroma Oblast, a village in Vlasovskoye Settlement of Oktyabrsky District in Kostroma Oblast; 
Lyamino, Nizhny Novgorod Oblast, a village in Nikolo-Pogostinsky Selsoviet of Gorodetsky District in Nizhny Novgorod Oblast; 
Lyamino, Yaroslavl Oblast, a village in Vereteysky Rural Okrug of Nekouzsky District in Yaroslavl Oblast